Robert Peterson (January 25, 1932 – July 30, 2011) was an American basketball player. He played three seasons in the National Basketball Association (NBA), from 1953 to 1956.

Peterson, a 6'5" forward from Sequoia High School in Redwood City, California,  played collegiately for San Mateo Junior College and the University of Oregon.

Following his college career, Peterson was drafted by the Baltimore Bullets in the 1953 NBA draft.  He split his rookie season between the Bullets and the Milwaukee Hawks, averaging 7.5 minutes, 1.9 points and 1.5 rebounds per game in eight contests.  He then signed with the New York Knicks prior to the 1954–55 NBA season, sticking with the team for two seasons.  Peterson's averaged 4.7 points and 3.8 rebounds per game for his NBA career.

Peterson died of cancer on July 30, 2011.

References

External links
 

1932 births
2011 deaths
American men's basketball players
Baltimore Bullets (1944–1954) draft picks
Baltimore Bullets (1944–1954) players
Basketball players from California
College of San Mateo alumni
Deaths from cancer in California
Forwards (basketball)
Junior college men's basketball players in the United States
Milwaukee Hawks players
New York Knicks players
Oregon Ducks men's basketball players
People from Menlo Park, California